WrestleMania VI was the sixth annual WrestleMania professional wrestling pay-per-view (PPV) event produced by the World Wrestling Federation (WWF, now WWE). It took place on April 1, 1990, at SkyDome in Toronto, Ontario in Canada, marking the first WrestleMania to be held outside of the United States. The event had an announced attendance of 67,678, a record for the Skydome at the time. The main event of WrestleMania VI was "the Ultimate Challenge" — the main event match pitting WWF Champion Hulk Hogan against WWF Intercontinental Heavyweight Champion the Ultimate Warrior.

Production

Background 
WrestleMania is considered the World Wrestling Federation's (WWF, now WWE) flagship pay-per-view event, having first been held in 1985. It is held annually between mid-March to mid-April. It was the first of the WWF's original four annual pay-per-views, which includes Royal Rumble, SummerSlam, and Survivor Series, which were eventually dubbed the "Big Four". WrestleMania VI was chosen to be held on April 1, 1990, at the SkyDome in Toronto, Ontario, Canada, marking the first WrestleMania to be held outside of the United States.

Storylines 
On February 3, 1990, a week after Hogan and Warrior crossed paths in the 1990 Royal Rumble match, Hogan put forth "the Ultimate Challenge" to Warrior, and had to know whether "Hulkamania" or the "power of Warrior" was the "strongest force" in the WWF. On February 10, the match was officially announced as the main event of WrestleMania VI by then WWF President Jack Tunney. On February 24, Tunney announced that both the WWF Championship and WWF Intercontinental Championship would be on the line for the first time ever during the match.

Event 

Future multi-time world champions Edge and Christian were in attendance at WrestleMania VI, as were Lance Storm and Renee Paquette. Actor Stephen Amell, who would go on to compete in a match at SummerSlam in 2015, was also in attendance. Mary Tyler Moore was sitting at ringside.

The first bout was a singles match in which Paul Roma defeated the Brooklyn Brawler. This was a dark match which did not air on the pay-per-view broadcast.

The pay-per-view broadcast opened with Robert Goulet singing O Canada. 

The second bout, and the first match to air on the pay-per-view broadcast, was a singles bout between Koko B. Ware and Rick Martel. Martel won the match by submission using a Quebec Crab.

The third bout was a tag team match in which WWF Tag Team Champions the Colossal Connection defended their titles against Demolition. Demolition won the bout to become the new WWF Tag Team Champions after Ax pinned Haku following a Demolition Decapitation. Immediately after the match, the Colossal Connection's manager Bobby Heenan began yelling at André the Giant in the ring, blaming him for the loss and slapping him in the face. In response, André grabbed Heenan and knocked Heenan out of the ring; when Haku attempted to sneak attack André, André caught his leg and knocked Haku from the ring, making André a face for the first time in three years. 

The fourth bout was a singles match pitting Earthquake against Hercules. Earthquake won the bout by pinfall following an Earthquake Splash.

Following the fourth bout, columnist Rona Barrett interviewed Miss Elizabeth.

The fifth bout was a singles match pitting Brutus "The Barber" Beefcake against Mr. Perfect. Beefcake won the bout by pinfall using a schoolboy, marking what was credited as Mr Perfect's first loss in the WWF. Following the match, Beefcake knocked out Mr. Perfect's manager The Genius using a sleeper hold, then used shears to cut his hair.

The sixth bout was a singles match pitting Bad News Brown against "Rowdy" Roddy Piper. The match ended in a double count-out after both men brawled out of the ring.

Following the sixth bout, a backstage segment aired in which Steve Allen sang the State Anthem of the Soviet Union with the Bolsheviks. 

The seventh bout was a tag team match pitting the Bolsheviks against the Hart Foundation. The Hart Foundation won a short squash when Bret Hart pinned Boris Zhukov following a Hart Attack.

The eighth bout was a singles match pitting the Barbarian against Tito Santana. The Barbarian won the bout by pinfall following a flying clothesline.

The ninth bout was a mixed tag team match pitting Dusty Rhodes and Sapphire against "Macho King" Randy Savage and Queen Sherri. Rhodes and Sapphire won the bout when Sapphire pinned Queen Sherri using a roll-up.

The tenth bout was a tag team match pitting the Orient Express against the Rockers. The Orient Express won the bout after their manager Mr. Fuji tripped Marty Jannetty and then Sato threw salt in his eyes, causing him to be counted-out.

Following the tenth bout, the tag team of Rhythm and Blues were introduced by Steve Allen.

The eleventh bout was a singles match pitting Dino Bravo against "Hacksaw" Jim Duggan. Duggan won the bout by pinfall after hitting Bravo with a 2×4.

The twelfth bout was a singles match in which "The Million Dollar Man" Ted DiBiase defended the Million Dollar Championship against Jake "The Snake" Roberts. DiBiase won the match by count-out after his bodyguard Virgil attached Roberts outside of the ring, preventing him from re-entering in time.

The thirteenth bout was a singles match pitting Akeem against Big Boss Man. Big Boss Man won the bout by pinfall following a Boss Man Slam.

Following the thirteenth bout, Rhythm and Blues and their manager Jimmy Hart were driven to the ring in a pink Cadillac by Diamond Dallas Page, where they performed the song "Hunka Hunka Honky Love". After performing the song, they were attacked by the Bushwackers who chased them from the ring and destroyed their instruments.

The fourteenth bout was a singles match pitting Jimmy Snuka against "Ravishing" Rick Rude. Rude won the bout by pinfall following a Rude Awakening.

The main event bout was a Winner Takes All match between WWF Champion Hulk Hogan and WWF Intercontinental Champion the Ultimate Warrior. The Ultimate Warrior won the bout by pinfall following a big splash, thus becoming the new WWF Champion and the first person to hold the WWF Championship and WWF Intercontinental Championship simultaneously.

Reception 
The event received mixed-to-positive reviews, though most reviewers praised the main event between Hogan and Warrior. Jason Powell was among the reviewers who praised the main event, calling it "A truly amazing match considering the limitations of both men, particularly Warrior". However, he went on to say, "The overall WrestleMania 6 card was softer than WrestleMania 5 card, but it was a better show that [sic] WrestleManias 1, 2, and 4". The Hulk Hogan-Ultimate Warrior match was named 1990's "Match of the Year" by Pro Wrestling Illustrated magazine readers.

The match between Roddy Piper and Bad News Brown received heavy criticism for featuring Piper (at that point a babyface) being painted in half-black against the African American Brown. In 2021, the match and promo was removed from the version of WrestleMania VI streamed on Peacock in the United States.

Aftermath 
Because Intercontinental Heavyweight Champion The Ultimate Warrior defeated Hulk Hogan to win the WWF Championship, Warrior was forced to vacate the Intercontinental Heavyweight Championship, as the rules prohibited any wrestler from holding more than one singles belt simultaneously. An eight-man tournament was held, conducted on the WWF's syndicated WWF Superstars of Wrestling and WWF Wrestling Challenge, with Mr. Perfect winning the title by defeating Tito Santana in the finals.

When Brutus "The Barber" Beefcake defeated Mr. Perfect at Wrestlemania VI, it was billed as Perfect's first pinfall loss in the WWF. However, in reality, Perfect had been pinned by The Ultimate Warrior in a match at Madison Square Garden that aired on the MSG Network less than two weeks prior to WrestleMania.  Brutus would continue his feud with Perfect (with an Intercontinental title match pending at SummerSlam 1990) until a parasailing accident in July 1990 put Brutus out of wrestling for nearly a year.

As the new WWF Champion, The Ultimate Warrior would initially be a successful main event draw, with his main rival being "Ravishing" Rick Rude – a wrestler he had fought during much of 1989 over the Intercontinental Heavyweight Championship – during the spring and summer of 1990. 

Hulk Hogan wrestled several matches in Japan shortly after WrestleMania VI but soon began feuding with the 470-pound Earthquake, with that feud heating up when Earthquake sneak-attacked Hogan on The Brother Love Show in May. Announcers explained that Hogan's injuries from the attack and the loss to Warrior both took such a huge toll on his fighting spirit that he wanted to retire, and viewers were persuaded to write Hogan to encourage him to return. Hogan would return by SummerSlam in August 1990 and got revenge on Earthquake, dominating him in matches that continued into early 1991.

WrestleMania VI would prove to be André the Giant's last televised match in the WWF as real-life health problems with acromegaly were continuing to take their toll. Andre returned to the WWF late in 1990 for several non-wrestling appearances that continued into 1991, but Andre's health would continue to decline, and he died on January 27, 1993. 

Demolition began a slow heel turn during the spring of 1990, adding a third member Crush to the team. This was due to Bill Eadie (who competed as Ax) desiring to take a lesser active role in wrestling, and Crush and Smash would soon become the primary defenders of the belt.

WrestleMania VI marked Jesse Ventura's last stint as a color commentator at a WWF pay-per-view event. He continued his role as an on-air color commentator for WWF Superstars of Wrestling through August 1990, at which time he left the company.

At the 1998 edition of their annual Halloween Havoc pay-per-view event, rival promotion World Championship Wrestling (WCW) pitted Hogan against Warrior once again. Hogan won with outside assistance, giving each man one victory apiece. The contest has gained a reputation as one of the worst bouts in history, being vilified by critics, then-WCW president Eric Bischoff, and former company announcer Gene Okerlund. Bischoff has disputed the rumor that he hired Warrior merely to give Hogan an opportunity to avenge his WrestleMania VI loss.

Results

See also

Professional wrestling in Canada
1980s professional wrestling boom

References

External links 
 
 

1990 in Toronto
1990 WWF pay-per-view events
April 1990 events in Canada
Events in Toronto
Professional wrestling in Toronto
WrestleMania
WWE in Canada